Luis Miño (born 8 January 1989) is a Paraguayan footballer who plays as a midfielder for Guaireña FC.

References

External links

1989 births
Living people
Paraguayan footballers
People from Paraguarí Department
Paraguay international footballers
Paraguayan Primera División players
Independiente F.B.C. footballers
Sportivo Luqueño players
Club Nacional footballers
Chiapas F.C. footballers
Paraguayan expatriate footballers
Paraguayan expatriate sportspeople in Mexico
Expatriate footballers in Mexico
Association football midfielders